Wild Horse Creek is a small principal stream located in the Vaca Mountains within northern Solano County, California. It flows from Lake Madigan and Lake Frey, and joins with Green Valley Creek.

References

Rivers of Solano County, California